The 47th Golden Horse Awards (Mandarin:第47屆金馬獎) took place on November 20, 2010 at Taoyuan Arts Center in Taoyuan, Taiwan.

References

47th
2010 film awards
2010 in Taiwan